The 2022–23 Alabama Crimson Tide women's basketball will represent University of Alabama in the 2022–23 college basketball season. Led by tenth year head coach Kristy Curry , the team will play their games at Coleman Coliseum and are members of the Southeastern Conference.

Preseason

SEC media poll
The SEC media poll was released on October 18, 2022.

Schedule and results

|-
!colspan=12 style=|Non-conference regular season

|-
!colspan=12 style=|SEC regular season

|-
!colspan=9 style=| SEC Tournament

|-
!colspan=9 style=| NCAA tournament

Rankings

See also
 2022–23 Alabama Crimson Tide men's basketball team

References

Alabama Crimson Tide women's basketball seasons
Alabama Crimson Tide
Alabama Crimson Tide women's basketball
Alabama Crimson Tide women's basketball
Alabama